Tremulicerus is a genus of true bugs belonging to the family Cicadellidae.

The species of this genus are found in Europe, Northern America and New Zealand.

Species:
 Tremulicerus distinguendus (Kirschbaum, 1868) 
 Tremulicerus fulgidus (Fabricius, 1775)

References

Cicadellidae
Hemiptera genera